Simon Skarlatidis (born 6 June 1991) is a German professional footballer who plays as a midfielder for Regionalliga Bayern club SpVgg Unterhaching.

Career
Skarlatidis played youth football for VfB Stuttgart, SV Fellbach, TSG Backnang and Sonnenhof Großaspach. With Backnang, he was part of the team losing to Stuttgarter Kickers in the 2009 Württemberg Cup for U19 teams. Shortly thereafter, he moved to Sonnenhof Großaspach where he played in the Regionalliga Südwest. In 2014, the club won the Regionalliga Südwest and were promoted to the 3. Liga after beating VfL Wolfsburg II in two play-off games. 

In 2015, after six years with the club, Skarlatidis moved to Erzgebirge Aue, which had just suffered relegation from the 2. Bundesliga. In the 2015–16 season, Skarlatidis was promoted directly back to the 2. Bundesliga with the club. In the following season, 2016–17, he made eleven appearances until February 2017, scoring two goals. In the league game against Dynamo Dresden on 26 February 2017, Skarlatidis suffered a metacarpal fracture and missed the remainder of the season. His contract, which expired in 2017, was not renewed.

On 15 June 2017, Skarlatidis joined Würzburger Kickers on a two-year contract.

After two seasons with Würzburger Kickers, he signed with 1. FC Kaiserslautern on a two-year deal on 29 May 2019. In May 2021, Skarlatidis announced that he had not received a new contract with the club, which meant that he would become a free agent after the 2020–21 season.

Skarlatidis moved to SpVgg Unterhaching on 17 May 2021, competing in the Regionalliga Bayern.

Personal life
Skarlatidis was born to a Greek father and German mother.

References

External links
 

1991 births
Living people
German footballers
German people of Greek descent
SG Sonnenhof Großaspach players
VfB Stuttgart players
FC Erzgebirge Aue players
Würzburger Kickers players
1. FC Kaiserslautern players
SpVgg Unterhaching players
3. Liga players
2. Bundesliga players
Regionalliga players
Association football midfielders
People from Waiblingen
Sportspeople from Stuttgart (region)
Footballers from Baden-Württemberg